Hirsutella is a genus of asexually reproducing fungi in the Ophiocordycipitaceae family. Originally described by French mycologist Narcisse Théophile Patouillard in 1892, this genus includes species that are pathogens of insects, mites and nematodes; there is interest in the use of these fungi as biological controls of insect and nematode pests. The teleomorphs of Hirsutella species are thought to belong to the genus Ophiocordyceps.

Species

Hirsutella abietina
Hirsutella acerosa
Hirsutella acridiorum
Hirsutella aphidis
Hirsutella asiae
Hirsutella atewensis
Hirsutella barberi
Hirsutella besseyi
Hirsutella brownorum
Hirsutella citriformis
Hirsutella clavispora
Hirsutella coccidiicola
Hirsutella crinita
Hirsutella cryptosclerotium
Hirsutella danubiensis
Hirsutella darwinii
Hirsutella dendritica
Hirsutella dipterigena
Hirsutella entomophila
Hirsutella exoleta
Hirsutella floccosa
Hirsutella formicarum
Hirsutella fusiformis
Hirsutella gigantea
Hirsutella graptopsaltriae
Hirsutella gregis
Hirsutella guignardii
Hirsutella guyana
Hirsutella haptospora
Hirsutella heteroderae
Hirsutella heteropoda
Hirsutella huangshanensis
Hirsutella hunanensis
Hirsutella illustris
Hirsutella jonesii
Hirsutella kirchneri
Hirsutella lecaniicola
Hirsutella leizhouensis
Hirsutella liberiana
Hirsutella liboensis
Hirsutella longicolla
Hirsutella longissima
Hirsutella minnesotensis
Hirsutella necatrix
Hirsutella neovolkiana
Hirsutella nivea
Hirsutella nodulosa
Hirsutella nutans
Hirsutella ovalispora
Hirsutella parasitica
Hirsutella patouillardii
Hirsutella petchabunensis
Hirsutella pichilinguensis
Hirsutella piligena
Hirsutella proturicola
Hirsutella radiata
Hirsutella ramosa
Hirsutella rhossiliensis
Hirsutella rostrata
Hirsutella rubripunctata
Hirsutella satumaensis
Hirsutella saussurei
Hirsutella setosa
Hirsutella sphaerospora
Hirsutella sporodochialis
Hirsutella stilbelliformis
Hirsutella strigosa
Hirsutella stylophora
Hirsutella subramanianii
Hirsutella subulata
Hirsutella surinamensis
Hirsutella thompsonii
Hirsutella tydeicola
Hirsutella uncinata
Hirsutella vandergeestii
Hirsutella vermicola
Hirsutella versicolor
Hirsutella verticillioides
Hirsutella volkiana
Hirsutella yunnanensis
Hirsutella zhangjiajiensis

References
 
 G.H. Sung et al. Phylogenetic classification of Cordyceps and the clavicipitaceous fungi. Studies in Mycology 67 

Sordariomycetes genera
Ophiocordycipitaceae
Taxa named by Narcisse Théophile Patouillard
Taxa described in 1892